Brigita Langerholc (born July 23, 1976 in Kranj, Slovenia) is a Slovenian middle distance runner who specializes in the 800 metres.

She finished fourth at the 2000 Olympics in a then personal best time of 1:58.51 minutes. In 2001, she won the silver medal at the Mediterranean Games and a gold medal at the Universiade. She then finished fifth at the 2006 European Athletics Championships in Gothenburg and sixth at the 2007 European Indoor Championships.

She has competed at the World Championships in 1999, 2001, 2003 and 2005 without ever reaching the final.

In Osaka 2007 World championship she finished fifth in final with 1:58:52. In semifinal she ran PB 1:58.41.

Running for Gimnazia Ljubljana, she set the Slovenian national high school record in the 400 metres.  She followed that with a 5th place showing at the 1995 European Athletics Junior Championships.  She attended college at the University of Southern California, where she was an 8 time All American in the 800 and 4x400 relay. She won the 800 meters at the 2001 NCAA Championships to help the USC Trojans win their first women's NCAA Championship ever.  Her time from the 2000 Olympics is the USC school record and Pac-12 record.

Competition record

National titles
NCAA Championships
800 m: 2001

References

External links

1976 births
Living people
Slovenian female middle-distance runners
Athletes (track and field) at the 2000 Summer Olympics
Athletes (track and field) at the 2008 Summer Olympics
Olympic athletes of Slovenia
Sportspeople from Kranj
Track and field athletes from California
American female middle-distance runners
Universiade medalists in athletics (track and field)
Mediterranean Games silver medalists for Slovenia
Mediterranean Games medalists in athletics
Athletes (track and field) at the 2001 Mediterranean Games
Athletes (track and field) at the 2005 Mediterranean Games
Universiade gold medalists for Slovenia
Universiade silver medalists for Slovenia
Medalists at the 1999 Summer Universiade
Medalists at the 2001 Summer Universiade
21st-century American women